Aaron Alex Pressley (born 7 November 2001) is a Scottish professional footballer who plays as a forward for  club Accrington Stanley, on loan from  club Brentford. He is a product of the Aston Villa and Heart of Midlothian academies and was capped by Scotland at U16 and U17 level.

Club career

Brentford 
After beginning his career in the Heart of Midlothian and Aston Villa academies, Pressley transferred to the B team at Championship club Brentford on 29 January 2020. During what remained of the COVID-19-affected 2019–20 season, he scored three goals in six appearances. As a result of the EFL permitting 9 substitutes to be named in matchday squads partway through the 2020–21 season, Pressley was promoted onto the first team substitutes' bench and was named in 15 matchday squads between November 2020 and February 2021. He made three substitute appearances during the period, but was not involved in Brentford's promotion-winning playoff campaign at the end of the season. Pressley top-scored with 19 goals in 26 B team appearances during the 2020–21 season and was voted the team's Players' Player of the Year. In May 2021, he signed a new two-year contract, with a one-year option.

After Brentford's promotion to the Premier League, Pressley joined League One club AFC Wimbledon on loan for the duration of the 2021–22 season. Prior to being sidelined for 9 weeks with a hamstring injury suffered in a mid-December 2021 training match, he had made 25 appearances and scored four goals. As part of his return to fitness, Pressley was named in Brentford B's 2022 Atlantic Cup squad and made one appearance at the tournament. Following his return to the AFC Wimbledon squad in late February 2022, Pressley made two substitute appearances before suffering a reoccurrence of the injury, which ended his season and he returned to Brentford for surgery and rehabilitation. In his absence, the Dons were relegated to League Two.

Pressley returned to match play with the B team in mid-November 2022 and on 4 January 2023, he joined League One club Accrington Stanley on loan until the end of the 2022–23 season. On his second appearance, Pressley's two goals and performance in a EFL Trophy quarter-final penalty shoot-out win over Lincoln City saw him win the competition's Player of the Round award.

International career 
Pressley was capped by Scotland at U16 and U17 level. In November 2021, he won his maiden U21 call up for a pair of 2023 European U21 Championship qualifiers and remained an unused substitute in both matches.

Personal life 
Pressley is the son of footballer and manager Steven Pressley and the older Pressley worked with his son in the role of Head of Individual Development at Brentford. Pressley walked out with his father as a mascot at the 2006 Scottish Cup Final. He attended Cramond Primary School and Princethorpe College. As of February 2021, Pressley was living in Richmond. When Pressley's former Aston Villa academy teammate Charlie Farr transferred to Brentford early in the 2022–23 season, he roomed with Pressley.

Career statistics

Honours 

 Brentford B Players' Player of the Year: 2020–21

References

External links

Aaron Pressley at brentfordfc.com

2001 births
Scottish footballers
Scotland youth international footballers
Brentford F.C. players
Aston Villa F.C. players
Living people
Association football forwards
Footballers from Edinburgh
English Football League players
People educated at Princethorpe College
AFC Wimbledon players
Accrington Stanley F.C. players